Patrick Jephson is an Irish-born British-American journalist, television presenter, and author who was previously the private secretary and equerry to Diana, Princess of Wales.

Biography
Jephson was born and raised in Ireland.  He was awarded a master's degree in political science from Cambridge University.

Jephson served in the British Royal Navy for a decade and was then selected for the Royal Household.
Jephson was the private secretary to Princess Diana from 1988 to 1996.

In 1995 then BBC television journalist Martin Bashir produced what later proved to be forged bank documents indicating that Jephson was spying on the Princess of Wales in order to secure an interview with Diana.  On 22 January 1996, shortly before the story of Tiggy Legge-Bourke's unfounded abortion allegation was published, Jephson resigned, as did his assistant Nicole Cockell the next day. Jephson later wrote that Diana had "exulted in accusing Legge-Bourke of having had an abortion".

In 2022 the BBC apologised and paid sizable compensation to Jephson for the damages he incurred from the false allegations made against him by Bashir while he was working for the network.

Jephson is the author of Shadows of a Princess: An Intimate Account By Her Private Secretary (Harper 2000).

Jephson subsequently emigrated to the United States, and became a naturalised U.S. citizen in 2015. He resides in Washington, D.C. He is married to Mary Jo Jacobi.

In popular culture
Jepshson is played in the 2013 film Diana by Charles Edwards.  In season 4 of The Crown, he is portrayed by Tom Turner and in season 5 by Jamie Glover.

Jephson also currently serves as a historical consultant to the aforementioned Netflix series The Crown.

References

Alumni of the University of Cambridge
Members of the British Royal Household
Irish emigrants to the United Kingdom
British emigrants to the United States
Irish emigrants to the United States
Naturalized citizens of the United States
Living people
Year of birth missing (living people)